Cross & Change is the third Korean language studio album by South Korean band F.T. Island, released on July 16, 2009. The album contains 12 songs and the band's image is formulated around "bokgo", a retro style popular in Korea in the 1970s and 1980s.

Track list

References

2009 albums
Pop rock albums by South Korean artists
FNC Entertainment albums
F.T. Island albums
Korean-language albums